Hard Time Romance or Vaya con Dios is a 1991 American romantic comedy film written and directed by John Lee Hancock. The film tells the story of a cowboy who goes through numerous obstacles in the hopes of marrying his girlfriend. It stars Leon Rippy, Tom Everett, and Mariska Hargitay.

External links
 

1991 films
1991 romantic comedy films
American romantic comedy films
Films directed by John Lee Hancock
1991 directorial debut films
1990s English-language films
1990s American films